Timothy Thomas Jr. (born April 15, 1974) is an American former professional ice hockey goaltender who mainly played in the National Hockey League (NHL), most notably with the Boston Bruins.

He was born in Flint, Michigan and is a graduate of Davison High School. Thomas played college hockey for the University of Vermont for four years, from 1993–1997, during which he was drafted 217th overall by the Quebec Nordiques in the 1994 NHL Entry Draft. He played for several years in the minor leagues and Europe, before making it to the NHL at age 28, with the Boston Bruins. He finally emerged as the Bruins' starting goaltender at age 32. Thomas is a two-time winner of the Vezina Trophy (2009 and 2011) as the NHL's best goaltender, and was a member of Team USA in the 2010 Winter Olympics in Vancouver. Thomas won the Conn Smythe Trophy as the most valuable player in the 2011 Stanley Cup playoffs. He was the oldest player in NHL history to win the award at age 37. Thomas is one of four American-born players to win the Conn Smythe Trophy, along with Brian Leetch, Jonathan Quick, and Patrick Kane.

Playing career

College hockey
Thomas played four seasons (1993–97) of college hockey for the University of Vermont, posting an 81–43–15 record to go with a 2.70 GAA and .934 save percentage. He ranks third in the NCAA Division I record book in career saves (3,950). He led the nation in save percentage in 1996 (.924) and helped UVM's Catamounts to NCAA tournament appearances in his final two seasons, including a berth in the 1996 NCAA Frozen Four (a program first). He was a two-time All-ECAC Conference selection and a two-time NCAA East All-American. He ranks first all-time amongst Vermont goalies in games played (140), wins (81) and saves (3,950). At Vermont, Thomas played on the same team as former NHL All-Star Martin St. Louis.

Early pro years
Completing his four-year tenure at Vermont, Thomas played briefly for the Birmingham Bulls of the East Coast Hockey League (ECHL) and Houston Aeros of the International Hockey League (IHL) in 1997–98, before transferring overseas mid-season to HIFK of the Finnish SM-Liiga. Thomas played 18 games with a save percentage of .947 as the team advanced through the playoffs to defeat Ilves in the finals and win the Finnish championship. After signing with the Edmonton Oilers on June 4, 1998, Thomas initially moved to the American Hockey League (AHL) the following season with the Hamilton Bulldogs, where he played 15 games, before again transferring to HIFK. Thomas recorded a .917 save percentage in 14 games as HIFK made it to the league finals once more but finished as runners-up to TPS.

In 1999–2000, Thomas returned once again to North America to play for the Detroit Vipers of the IHL, then spent the next season with AIK IF of the Swedish Elitserien. In 2001, he joined the Boston Bruins organization, but chose to continue playing in Europe, spending his first full SM-liiga season in 2001–02 with Kärpät. Although the team did not get far in the playoffs, Thomas played a successful season of 32 games with a .925 save percentage.

AHL seasons, NHL debut
Beginning in 2002–03, Thomas played his initial two seasons with Boston's AHL affiliate, the Providence Bruins. He made his National Hockey League (NHL) debut with the Bruins during the 2002–03 season, appearing in four games total, with a .907 save percentage and a 3–1 record. Thomas recorded his first NHL win in his league debut with the Bruins on October 19, 2002, in a 31-save, 4–3 win against the Edmonton Oilers.

Return to Finland
As a result of the one-season duration NHL lockout in North America, in 2004–05 Thomas joined Jokerit of the SM-Liiga, his fourth stint in Finland. He played in all games of the season except one, 54 games in total, and posted a league-high .946 save percentage. He also surpassed the previous record of 13 shutouts in the league by achieving 15 shutouts during the regular season. Thomas continued to perform in the playoffs, where he played 12 games with a .938 save percentage. However, the team was unable to defeat Kärpät in the finals, and Thomas was awarded his second silver medal in the SM-liiga. He received the Lasse Oksanen trophy (as the league's best player) and the Kultainen kypärä award (as the league's best player award as voted by the players), becoming the first Jokerit player to win the award since Teemu Selänne.

Boston Bruins

2005–2006

In August 2005, Thomas signed to play with Jokerit for the 2005–06 season, but his contract included an NHL option and on September 14, one day before the regular season in the SM-liiga started, Thomas announced he had signed with the Boston Bruins, leaving Jokerit with rookie goaltender Joonas Hallikainen as their sole goaltender. Eventually, Jokerit used three North American goaltenders (Karl Goehring, Steve Passmore and Tom Askey) that season, but missed the playoffs.

When he returned to North America, Thomas was assigned to the Providence Bruins of the AHL out of training camp. However, as Boston suffered injuries to their two goaltenders Andrew Raycroft and Hannu Toivonen, Thomas earned his first call-up to the NHL in three years and took over as the Bruins starter, completing the 2005–06 season with a 12–13–7 record, 2.77 goals against average (GAA), .917 save percentage and his first NHL shutout. As a result, Thomas was awarded the Boston Bruins 7th Player Award, voted by the fans as having gone beyond expectations. In the off-season, Thomas was re-signed by the Bruins to a three-year contract.

2006–2009
Although Boston's previous starter, Andrew Raycroft, was traded to the Toronto Maple Leafs in the off-season, Thomas began the 2006–07 season as the Bruins' backup, behind Hannu Toivonen instead. However, as Toivonen struggled, Thomas was again promoted as the Bruins' starting goaltender, eventually posting a 30–29–4 record with a .904 save percentage. He won the 7th Player Award for the second consecutive season and became the first goaltender in team history to win the award twice.

During the summer of 2007, Thomas began a yoga-based physical conditioning program to increase his flexibility and strength, and one that would greatly increase his abilities during the 2007–08 season and onwards.
 

On July 1, 2007, the Bruins acquired goaltender Manny Fernandez from the Minnesota Wild and later traded Thomas' previous backup, Toivonen, to the St. Louis Blues. Many hockey analysts presumed Thomas would support Fernandez as a backup goaltender once again for the 2007–08 season. However, as Fernandez went down to injury early in the season, Thomas seized the opportunity and once again emerged as the Bruins' starter. He was selected for his first NHL All-Star Game on January 22, 2008, as a replacement for Martin Brodeur and played in the third period of the game, stopping 14 of 18 shots. Thomas was credited with the win, as the Eastern Conference defeated the Western Conference 8–7.

Early in the 2008–09 season, Thomas became the first Bruins goaltender to record back-to-back shutouts since Byron Dafoe in 1999, winning 1–0 games against the Edmonton Oilers on October 27, 2008, and the Vancouver Canucks on October 28. His overall shutout streak came to end the next game at 154:43 minutes against the Calgary Flames on October 30. In late November, Thomas missed a few games due to an illness. He was chosen to play in his second All-Star Game in 2009 and was once again the winning goaltender for the Eastern Conference, defeating the Western Conference 12–11 in a shootout (the first time the All-Star Game required the tie-breaker since 2003). One month later, on February 26, 2009, Thomas recorded his 100th NHL win in a 6–0 shutout against the Anaheim Ducks.

2009–2010
On April 2, 2009 Thomas agreed to a four-year contract extension with the Bruins, through the 2012–13 season. The contract saw him make $6 million the first two seasons, then $5 million and $3 million the final two seasons for an average annual salary of $5 million. Two days later, on April 4, he posted his career-high fifth shutout of the season in a 1–0 win against the New York Rangers, clinching the top spot in the Eastern Conference, Boston's first title since 2001–02. His strong play allowed the Bruins to sweep the Montreal Canadiens in the first round of the 2009 playoffs, however the Bruins were defeated by the Carolina Hurricanes in seven games in the second round.

On June 18, 2009, Thomas was awarded the Vezina Trophy at the NHL awards, edging Minnesota Wild netminder Niklas Bäckström and the Columbus Blue Jackets' rookie goaltender Steve Mason. He led the NHL with his 2.10 GAA and .933 save percentage.

Thomas started for the Bruins in the 3rd NHL Winter Classic on January 1, 2010. The game, held at Fenway Park in Boston, resulted in a 2–1 overtime victory over the visiting Philadelphia Flyers. But Thomas suffered a drop-off in form during the regular season, posting just a 17–18–8 record, albeit with a still-strong 2.56 GAA. He did not play at all in the playoffs, as Tuukka Rask played all the games for Boston. The Bruins won their First Round series and led the Philadelphia Flyers three games to none in the Conference semi-final. Boston then lost the next four games to drop the series; the Flyers became just the third out of four teams in NHL history (after the 1942 Toronto Maple Leafs and the 1975 New York Islanders, and before the 2014 Los Angeles Kings) to win a series after losing the first three games.

Named to his third straight NHL All-Star Game in 2011 – the game was not played in 2010 due to the Winter Olympics – Thomas became the first goaltender in NHL history to earn the win in three consecutive All-Star Games.

2010–2011 and Stanley Cup win
In the 2010–11 season, following off-season hip surgery during the summer of 2010, Thomas broke the NHL record for save percentage, beating Dominik Hašek's record of .937, with a .938 percentage. On April 22, 2011, Thomas was named a finalist for the 2010–11 Vezina Trophy, which he won on June 22.

On May 27, 2011, Thomas posted a shutout victory over the Tampa Bay Lightning in Game 7 of the Eastern Conference Finals, sending the Bruins to their first Stanley Cup appearance since 1990. In the Final, Thomas again posted a shutout victory in Game 7 against the Vancouver Canucks. During the Bruins' playoff run, he set the record for most saves in a single post-season with 798 and the most saves in a Stanley Cup series with 238, and broke Frank McCool's 66-year-old record of fewest goals allowed in a seven-game Stanley Cup Final, allowing only eight goals total (for an all-time record .967 save percentage in the Stanley Cup Finals). Thomas also became the first goaltender ever to post a shutout in a Game 7 on the road. He won the Conn Smythe Trophy as playoff MVP, and at 37 years, 62 days, Thomas is the oldest recipient of the award. He became just the second American-born NHL player to ever win the award, 17 years after Brian Leetch did so in 1994, plus Thomas was also the first American-born goaltender to receive this honor.

2011–2012 and subsequent break from hockey
Thomas began the 2011–12 season as a Stanley Cup champion and the defending Vezina and Conn Smythe trophy winner. He played the majority of the 82-game schedule for the Bruins, beating Tuukka Rask for the number one spot for the second consecutive year. Although not completely matching the previous year's record-breaking run, Thomas received the most votes in the 2012 All Star Game Ballot, entering the 2012 NHL All-Star Game as the starting goaltender, and put up another solid year with the Bruins, helping them dominate the NHL with their goal differential for the majority of the year.

The Bruins ended up losing in seven games to the Washington Capitals in the first round of the Eastern Conference playoffs. Every game of the series was won by only one goal. Shortly after the Bruins' season ended, Thomas announced that he would sit out the 2012–13 season. Bruins' general manager Peter Chiarelli confirmed Thomas' decision.

With the retirement of Adam Foote during the off-season, Thomas became one of only two Quebec Nordiques draft picks still active in the NHL, the other being Milan Hejduk.

Thomas was traded to the New York Islanders on February 7, 2013, in exchange for a conditional second-round draft pick in either 2014 or 2015. Before the trade, the Bruins had suspended Thomas for not reporting to training camp. Thomas did not play any games with the Islanders organization before his contract expired.

Thomas' 196 regular-season wins with Boston ranks him fifth on the team's all-time list as of 2021.

Florida Panthers and Dallas Stars

2013–2014
After taking a year off from the NHL, Thomas joined the Florida Panthers on a tryout contract on September 16, 2013. He officially signed a one-year contract with the Panthers on September 26. Thomas has mentioned he chose 34 as his jersey number with the Panthers in honor of John Vanbiesbrouck, a goaltender from Michigan whom he grew up watching.

Thomas was acquired by the Dallas Stars on March 5, 2014, in exchange for goaltender Dan Ellis. He went back to number 30 in Dallas and served as backup to Kari Lehtonen.

International play

During Thomas' college career with the University of Vermont, he was twice named to the United States squad for the World Championships. Following his sophomore year, he was chosen for the 1995 World Championships, but did not appear in any games as the United States finished in sixth place. He was chosen for the tournament for the second consecutive year in 1996 and made his international debut, playing in 21 minutes for one game, allowing one goal. Thomas picked up his first medal as the United States won bronze. 

After graduating from the college program, Thomas was named to Team USA for the 1998 World Championships following his rookie professional season and played his first full international game. However, the United States finished a disappointing 12th. Thomas would not make another World Championships appearance until 2005, where he was named to Team USA in another limited role, not appearing in any games behind starter Rick DiPietro as they failed to earn a medal. 

Established as an NHL starter following the 2007–08 season, Thomas was named to his fifth World Championships in 2008. He appeared in three games before suffering a groin injury, splitting starts with Robert Esche and posting a 1.50 GAA with one shutout against Latvia in the preliminaries. The United States finished in sixth place. 

On January 1, 2010, Thomas was selected to be a member of the United States men's hockey team for the 2010 Vancouver Olympics, serving as backup goaltender to the Buffalo Sabres' Ryan Miller. 

On February 26, 2010, Thomas made his Olympic debut in the United States–Finland semi-final, entering the game with approximately 11:30 remaining in the third period and a 6–0 lead. He replaced Ryan Miller to prevent any chance of injury to the American starter.

Personal life
Thomas and wife Melissa have three children: two daughters and a son. Thomas is a Christian and a Libertarian, and has stated that the person he would most like to have dinner with is conservative TV pundit Glenn Beck. After winning the Stanley Cup in 2011, Thomas skipped the traditional victors' meet-and-greet with President Barack Obama at the White House on January 23, 2012; he was the only active Bruin not to attend. He released a statement regarding his absence:

After retiring from hockey, Thomas resided in Sandpoint, Idaho. He and his family now reside in Milton, Vermont.

Awards and honors

Source: Tim Thomas on HockeyGoalies.org

SM-liiga
 Awarded the Urpo Ylönen trophy (best goaltender) in 1998
 Awarded the Kultainen kypärä award (best player as voted by the players) in 2005
 Awarded the Lasse Oksanen trophy (best player) in 2005 – first non-European to win the award

NHL
 4× NHL All-Star Game (2008, 2009, 2011, and 2012)
 William M. Jennings Trophy winner along with teammate Manny Fernandez for fewest goals allowed by team goaltenders (2009
 2× Vezina Trophy Winner (2009, 2011)
 2× NHL first All-Star team (2009, 2011)
 Conn Smythe Trophy winner (2011)
 Stanley Cup champion (2011)
 First goaltender to win the Stanley Cup, Vezina, and Conn Smythe trophies in the same season since Bernie Parent in the 1974–75 season.

Other
 2011 ESPY award winner – Best NHL Player
 2011 ESPY award winner – Best Championship Performance
 U.S. Hockey Hall of Fame Inductee

Records
 Most saves by a goaltender in a playoff run (798)
 Most saves by a goaltender in a Stanley Cup Final series (238)
 Best SM-liiga save precentage with at least a hundred games played (0.937)

Hockey camps
Thomas runs several ice hockey camps in the Northeast United States during the NHL off-season for both goaltenders and skaters.

Career statistics

Regular season and playoffs

International

References

External links
 
 Tim Thomas biography at hockeygoalies.org

1974 births
Living people
AIK IF players
American men's ice hockey goaltenders
Birmingham Bulls (ECHL) players
Boston Bruins players
Conn Smythe Trophy winners
Dallas Stars players
Detroit Vipers players
Florida Panthers players
Hamilton Bulldogs (AHL) players
HIFK (ice hockey) players
Houston Aeros (1994–2013) players
Ice hockey players from Michigan
Ice hockey players at the 2010 Winter Olympics
Jokerit players
Medalists at the 2010 Winter Olympics
National Hockey League All-Stars
Olympic silver medalists for the United States in ice hockey
Oulun Kärpät players
People from Davison, Michigan
Providence Bruins players
Sportspeople from Flint, Michigan
Stanley Cup champions
Quebec Nordiques draft picks
Vermont Catamounts men's ice hockey players
Vezina Trophy winners
William M. Jennings Trophy winners
AHCA Division I men's ice hockey All-Americans